The Australian Occupational Therapy Journal is a bimonthly peer-reviewed medical journal that covers occupational therapy. It was established in 1952 as the Bulletin of the Australian Association of Occupational Therapists, obtaining its current title in 1963. The journal is published by Wiley-Blackwell on behalf of Occupational Therapy Australia. The editor-in-chief is Anne Cusick (University of Sydney).

Abstracting and indexing
The journal is abstracted and indexed in:
CINAHL
EBSCO databases
Index Medicus/MEDLINE/PubMed
ProQuest databases
PsycINFO/Psychological Abstracts
Science Citation Index Expanded
Scopus
According to the Journal Citation Reports, the journal has a 2014 impact factor of 0.846.

References

External links

Occupational therapy journals
Bimonthly journals
Wiley-Blackwell academic journals
English-language journals
Publications established in 1952